Taphrina entomospora is a fungal plant pathogen that infects the leaves of Nothofagus. T. entomospora infection results in chlorosis and changes in parenchyma structure of the leaf causing premature senescence.  The species was first described scientifically by mycologist Roland Thaxter in 1910.

The distribution of T. entomospora is restricted to South America.

References

External links

Fungal tree pathogens and diseases
Taphrinomycetes
Fungi of Africa
Fungi described in 1910